The 2021 OL Reign season is the team's ninth season of play and their ninth season in the National Women's Soccer League, the top division of women's soccer in the United States.

On July 2, 2021, head coach Farid Benstiti resigned and was replaced by assistant coach Sam Laity in an interim capacity. Benstiti finished with a 2–1–4 record in the regular season.

On July 15, 2021, the team announced that Laura Harvey would return as head coach after the Tokyo Olympics, where she was serving as an assistant coach for the United States women's national team. Harvey officially assumed head coaching duties on August 9, 2021.

Team

Staff

Current roster

Competitions 

All times are in PT unless otherwise noted.

Regular season

Regular-season standings

Results summary

Results by matchday

Playoffs

Challenge Cup

Divisional standings

Appearances and goals

|-
|colspan="12" |Goalkeepers:
|-

|-
|colspan="12" |Defenders:
|-

|-
|colspan="12" |Midfielders:
|-

|-
|colspan="12" |Forwards:
|-

|-
|colspan="12" |Players who left the team during the season:
|-

|-
|colspan="12" |Own goals for:

|-
|colspan="12" |Others for:

|-

Transfers
For incoming transfers, dates listed are when OL Reign officially signed the players to the roster. Transactions where only the rights to the players are acquired (e.g., draft picks) are not listed. For outgoing transfers, dates listed are when OL Reign officially removed the players from its roster, not when they signed with another team. If a player later signed with another team, her new team will be noted, but the date listed here remains the one when she was officially removed from the OL Reign roster.

Transfers in

Draft picks
Draft picks are not automatically signed to the team roster. Only those who are signed to a contract will be listed as incoming transfers. Only trades involving draft picks and executed on the day of the 2021 NWSL Draft will be listed in the notes.

Transfers out

Loans in

Loans out

New contracts

Awards

NWSL annual awards
 Coach of the Year:  Laura Harvey
 Most Valuable Player:  Jess Fishlock
 Defender of the Year:  Alana Cook (finalist)
 Best XI:  Alana Cook,  Jess Fishlock,  Eugénie Le Sommer
 Second XI:  Bethany Balcer,  Sofia Huerta

Team awards
Announced on November 23, 2021.
 Most Valuable Player:  Jess Fishlock
 Golden Boot:  Bethany Balcer
 Young Player of the Year:  Alana Cook
 Community Champion:  Dani Weatherholt

NWSL Player of the Month

NWSL Team of the Month

NWSL Player of the Week

NWSL Save of the Week

References

External links 
 

OL Reign seasons
2021 in sports in Washington (state)
2021 National Women's Soccer League season
American soccer clubs 2021 season